Nick Macleod (born 23 March 1983 in Cardiff, Wales) is a former professional rugby union player who played for Cardiff Blues, Sale Sharks and Newport Gwent Dragons. Primarily a fly-half, Macleod also played at Fullback.

Macleod began the 2010–11 season as Sale's fly-half in the absence of the team's first choice, Charlie Hodgson; when Hodgson returned in late September he took over the position. In a Challenge Cup match for Sale against Cetransa El Salvador on 8 October 2010, Macleod equalled the club's record for most points scored in a game by a single player. When fly-half Charlie Hodgson, who previously held the record, was rested at half-time Macleod took over goal kicking. With two tries and eight successful conversions, Macleod scored 26 points in the match. The following month, Macleod experienced what he described a "highlight of [his] career so far" when he stepped up to captain Sale in a 24–19 defeat to Exeter. Regular captain Neil Briggs was unavailable due to injury and Macleod filled the position. Hodgson suffered a broken foot in December, ruling him out for several months. In his absence, Macleod took the role of Sale's regular fly-half. Macleod's elevation to the captaincy was temporary and winger Mark Cueto was appointed captain in late December 2010 by new coach Pete Anglesea, who replaced Mike Brewer as Sale had won just three out of nine matches in the 2010–11 season.

Hodgson left at the end of the 2010–11 season and the club chose not to sign a new fly-half. This meant that Macleod would be given a regular chance in the position. He had a successful run, scoring 231 points by mid-February when he signed a two-year extension on his contract.

MacLeod joined Newport Gwent Dragons for the 2016–17 season and made six appearances before suffering a ligament injury which eventually forced him to retire from professional rugby; he now works as a baker in Cardiff.

References

External links
Cardiff Blues profile
Dragons profile

1983 births
Living people
Cardiff Rugby players
Rugby union players from Cardiff
Sale Sharks players
Welsh rugby union players
Rugby union fly-halves